Henderson, formerly known as Henderson Island, is an unincorporated community and a U.S. Post Office in Adams County, Colorado, United States. Henderson has the ZIP Code 80640. Portions of the Henderson area have been annexed by  Commerce City, Brighton, and Thornton.

A post office called Henderson has been in operation since 1894.  The community was named after John D. "Colonel Jack" Henderson.

Geography
Henderson is located at  (39.921586,-104.868279).  Henderson Island is today the site of the Adams County Regional Park and Fairgrounds.

Current Day
Along with a post office, a few buildings remain of old Henderson along Brighton Road north of 120th Avenue. The Henderson Congregation Church (now Henderson Community Church) which has been in existence for over 100 years, stands as one of the last remaining vestiges of historical Henderson.

Ralphie IV, one of the mascots of the University of Colorado Buffaloes is buried in Henderson. She retired after 10 years of service and lived out her retirement in the community. She died of liver failure on March 19, 2017.

Education
School District 27J serves Henderson.

Businesses
Henderson is currently home to MYR Group Inc. and MYR Group subsidiary Sturgeon Electric Company, Inc. MYR Group is one of the leading electrical contractors in the United States and is publicly traded on the NASDAQ under the stock symbol MYRG.

Lineage Logistics has a facility in Henderson.

The Sinclair Oil Corporation had a trucking service terminal in Henderson.

Notable person
 Kelly Yarish, who was struck and killed by a Union Pacific 844 train while taking photos of it on the tracks.

See also

References

External links

 History of Henderson, Colorado @ Adams County

Unincorporated communities in Adams County, Colorado
Unincorporated communities in Colorado
Denver metropolitan area